The Cork Constitution (CC) is a rugby union club based in Cork, playing in Division 1A of the All-Ireland League. It was founded by staff of the Cork Constitution newspaper. Since the paper did not publish on Sundays, the staff were looking for activities to pursue on Saturday afternoons. In the summer, cricket was played, while in the winter, rugby was the designated activity. The team currently plays in Temple Hill, Ballintemple.

Due to the introduction of professional rugby union, and its success at producing players who go on to obtain Munster contracts, Con, like many other senior rugby clubs in Ireland, has been unable to field a full strength side for a number of years. In this period though, Con have remained competitive, reaching the final of the All-Ireland League on six occasions since 2001 inclusive; losing in 2001 to Dungannon, losing in 2002 to Shannon, again losing in 2004 to Shannon and losing in 2007 to Garryowen, winning the elusive third title in 2008 on beating Garryowen in Musgrave Park and capturing a fourth title when beating St. Mary's by 17 points to 10 after extra time in Dubarry Park in May 2010.
This 2010 League victory led by Evan Ryan completed an AIL double as Con had already won the AIL cup earlier in the season. The All-Ireland Bateman Cup, played between the Provincial Cup winners, was re-inaugurated in 2005-06, and Constitution have now won six times.

Honours
All-Ireland League: 6
1990–91, 1998–99, 2007-08, 2009–10, 2016–17, 2018–19
All-Ireland Cup: 7
2005–06, 2009–10, 2012–13, 2013–14, 2014–15, 2015–16, 2016–17
Munster Senior Cup: 30
1905–07, 1910, 1922–23, 1928–29, 1932–33, 1942–43, 1945–46, 1956–57, 1960–61, 1964–65, 1966–67, 1969–70, 1972–73, 1982–83, 1984–85, 1988–89, 2008–09, 2012–13, 2013–14, 2014–15, 2015–16, 2016–17 2018–19 2019–20
Munster Senior League 
1912 (shared), 1914 (shared), 1922, 1923, 1927, 1939, 1953, 1957, 1964, 1965, 1966, 1967, 1968, 1969, 1970, 1971, 1972, 1975, 1976, 1977, 1979, 1984, 1987, 1988, 1998

Notable players

 Stephen Archer
 Michael Bradley
 Paul Burke
 Rory Burke
 David Corkery
 Jack Crowley
 John Daly
 Shane Daly
 Jody Danaher
 Scott Deasy
 Ivan Dineen
 Len Dineen
 Garrett Fitzgerald
 Denis Fogarty
 John Fogarty
 Seán French
 Tom Gleeson
 Brian Hayes
 Billy Holland
 Jonathan Holland
 Anthony Horgan
 Darragh Hurley
 Gerry Hurley
 John Kelly
 Alex Kendellen
 Ralph Keyes
 Tom Kiernan
 Denis Leamy
 Donal Lenihan
 Cian Mahony
 Conor Mahony
 Jeremy Manning
 Paul McCarthy
 Alex McHenry
 Tommy Moroney
 Frank Murphy
 Kenny Murphy
 Noel F. Murphy
 Noel A. A. Murphy
 Ian Murray
 Ian Nagle
 Ross Noonan
 Kevin O'Byrne
 Donncha O'Callaghan
 Ultan O'Callaghan
 Liam O'Connor
 Mick O'Driscoll
 Ronan O'Gara
 Pat O'Hara
 David O'Mahony
 Peter O'Mahony
 Brian O'Meara
 John O'Neill
 Conrad O'Sullivan
 John Poland
 Brian Roche
 Mike Ross
 John Ryan
 Tim Ryan
 Frankie Sheahan
 Bodo Sieber
 Brian Toland
 Brian Walsh
 Duncan Williams
 Simon Zebo

References

External links
Cork Constitution official site

Irish rugby union teams
Rugby clubs established in 1892
Rugby union clubs in County Cork
Senior Irish rugby clubs (Munster)